The Fourth Battle of the Dardanelles in the Fifth Ottoman-Venetian War took place between 17  and 19 July 1657 outside the mouth of the Dardanelles Strait. The Ottomans succeeded in breaking the Venetian blockade over the Straits.

Ships involved

Venice and allies
Several ships were hired Dutch

Aquila Coronata (Dutch Kronede Arend)
San Giorgio (Zorzi) grande (Dutch Groote Sint Joris)
Paramore
Profeta Elia
Rosa Moceniga
Zardin d'Olanda (Hollandsche Tuyn)
Tamburlano
Principessa Reale
Principe di Venezia
Piccola Fortuna
Principessa grande
Principessa piccola
Gallo d'Oro
7 other sailing ships
7 galleasses
4 galleys - flag galley, under Mocenigo, blew up the next day

Ottoman Empire
18 sailing ships - 4 lost, 1 captured
10 galleasses - 1 sunk, 1 captured and several burnt about 3 days later
30 galleys - 1 captured that day or the next day
many transports and smaller vessels nearby

References
 

 
the Dardanelles 1657
Dardanelles 1657
Dardanelles 1657
Dardanelles 1657
History of the Dardanelles